Prof. Trilochan Sastry was formerly the Dean (Academics) at Indian Institute of Management, Bangalore. He is also a political activist, chairman of the Association for Democratic Reforms, and a frontline leader of the Right to Information campaign.

Education
Sastry obtained his Bachelors in Technology from IIT Delhi and a Post Graduate Diploma in Management from IIM Ahmedabad. Afterwards, he obtained his PhD from MIT, USA.

Academic career
Sastry is a professor of Quantitative Methods and Information Systems at IIMB since 2003, and as of 2012, also teaches a course on Social Entrepreneurship. Prior to joining IIMB, he was a professor at Indian Institute of Management, Ahmedabad. Prof. Trilochan Sastry is conferred with Satyendra K Dubey Memorial Award from IIT Kanpur (2011–12) for his contributions to bringing about transparency in public life. Other major positions which he has held are:

 Visiting Professor, International University of Japan, Niagata, Japan
 Visiting Professor, Hong Kong University of Science and Technology, Hong Kong
 Associate Dean (Research) and Professor - Indian School of Business, Hyderabad, India

His areas of interest include Operations Research, Supply Chain Management, Rural Development, Democracy and Governance.

Professional Appointments
 Member, Bretton Woods Committee, 2009 onwards
 Academic Council, Vivekananda University, Belur Math
 Board Member, and Dean (Academic) IIM Bangalore

Corporate / Public Sector Leadership
 Trustee of Cooperative Development Foundation, Hyderabad
 Chairman of Association for Democratic Reforms
 Secretary, Centre for Collective Development
 Director, NABARD, Mumbai
 Founder ,Farmveda

Awards
 "Satyendra K Dubey Memorial Award" from IIT Kanpur (2011–12)
 "Distinguished Alumnus" Award from IIT Delhi in 2012
 "Outstanding Contribution to National Development" Award from IIT Delhi Alumni Association in 2005
 "Best Young Teacher" for the year 1999, Association of Indian Management Schools

References

Academic staff of the Indian Institute of Management Bangalore
Living people
Year of birth missing (living people)